Conquestador was a 60-gun ship of the line of the Spanish Navy, launched in 1755.

She was captured by the Royal Navy on 13 August 1762, and commissioned as the fourth rate HMS Conquestador. She was placed on harbour service in 1775, and broken up in 1782.

See also
List of ships captured in the 18th century

Notes

References

Lavery, Brian (2003) The Ship of the Line – Volume 1: The development of the battlefleet 1650–1850. Conway Maritime Press. .

Conquestador (1755)
Ships of the line of the Royal Navy
1755 ships
Captured ships